Casselton Commercial Historic District is a  historic district in Casselton, North Dakota that was listed on the National Register of Historic Places in 1982.

The listing included 16 contributing buildings which historically included a department store, a financial institution, a Masonic meeting hall  and other businesses.

The Masonic Block, at 31 Sixth Avenue North was built in 1887 in two parts, the first being a  part with four brick pilasters and a pressed metal cornice.  The center of the cornice contains the words "MASONIC BLOCK", the date "1887" and a Masonic emblem.  A second  part was built adjacent, with identical cornice and finial.  In 2013, no Masonic lodges were known to be scheduled to meet in the building.

References

External links

Commercial buildings on the National Register of Historic Places in North Dakota
Geography of Cass County, North Dakota
Historic districts on the National Register of Historic Places in North Dakota
National Register of Historic Places in Cass County, North Dakota